Van Ikin (born 25 November 1951) is an academic and science fiction writer and editor. A professor in English at the University of Western Australia, he retired from teaching in 2015 and is now a senior honorary research fellow. He has acted as supervisor for several Australian writers completing their post-graduate degrees and doctorates — including science fiction and fantasy writers Terry Dowling, Stephen Dedman, and Dave Luckett — and received the university's Excellence in Teaching Award for Postgraduate Research Supervision in 2000.

Ikin is probably best known for his editorship of the long-running critical journal Science Fiction. He has reviewed science fiction and fantasy for The Sydney Morning Herald since 1984

Critical works
Strange Constellations: A History of Australian Science Fiction (with Russell Blackford & Sean McMullen) Westport, CT: Greenwood Press, 1998.
 Warriors of the Tao: The Best of Science Fiction: A Review of Speculative Literature (with Damien Broderick) (Borgo Press, 2011).
 Xeno Fiction: More Best of Science Fiction: A Review of Speculative Literature (with Damien Broderick (Wildside/Borgo, 2013)
 Fantastika at the Edge of Reality: Yet More Best of Science Fiction: A Review of Speculative Literature (with Damien Broderick (Wildside, 2014)
 Other Spacetimes: Interviews with Speculative Fiction Writers  — with Damien Broderick (Wildside, 2015)

Magazines edited

Enigma (University of Sydney SF Association, 1972–79)
Science Fiction (Issues 1-50, 1977–2019)

Anthologies edited

Australian Science Fiction (University of Queensland Press, 1981; reprint, Academy Editions, US, 1984).
Glass Reptile Breakout (Centre for Studies in Aust Literature, University of WA, 1990)
 Mortal Fire: Best Australian SF (with Terry Dowling) (Hodder/Coronet, 1993).

Awards

Australian Science Fiction Foundation, Chandler Award for his contribution to Australian science fiction (1992).

References

Paul Collins (ed). The MUP Encyclopedia of Australian Science Fiction and Fantasy Melbourne, Vic: Melbourne University Press, 1998, p. 94.

External links
Van Ikin's Home page

1951 births
Living people
Academic staff of the University of Western Australia
Australian literary critics
Australian science fiction writers
Australian speculative fiction critics
Australian speculative fiction editors
Science fiction editors
Australian people of Malaysian descent